The 1964 United States presidential election in Maine took place on November 3, 1964, as part of the 1964 United States presidential election, which was held throughout all fifty states and D.C. Voters chose four representatives, or electors to the Electoral College, who voted for president and vice president.

Maine was won by incumbent Democratic President Lyndon B. Johnson of Texas in a landslide over Republican U.S. Senator Barry Goldwater of Arizona. Johnson took 68.8% of the vote to Goldwater's 31.14%, a victory margin of 37.66 percentage points, and the strongest ever performance by a Democrat in the state. Johnson became the first Democrat since Woodrow Wilson in 1912 to carry this longstanding liberal Republican stronghold, and the first since Franklin Pierce in 1852 to win the state with an outright majority. Even amidst a national Democratic landslide, Maine weighed-in in this election as more than 15 points to the left of the nation at-large.

Background
Ever since the Republican Party formed in 1854 to stop the spread of slavery into the territories, Maine and nearby Vermont had been rock-ribbed Republican, except during the split of 1912 when the Pine Tree State went to Woodrow Wilson with less than forty percent of the vote. As recently as 1956, Dwight D. Eisenhower had won over seventy percent of the vote in the state for the GOP.

However, at the same time the GOP was turning its attention from the declining rural Yankee counties to the growing and traditionally Democratic Catholic vote, along with the conservative Sun Belt whose growth was driven by air conditioning. This growth meant that activist Republicans centred in the traditionally Democratic, but by the 1960s, middle-class Sun Belt had become much more conservative than the majority of members in the historic Northeastern GOP stronghold.

The consequence of this was that a bitterly divided Grand Old Party was able to nominate the staunchly conservative Senator Barry Goldwater of Arizona, who ran with the equally conservative Republican National Committee chair, Congressman William E. Miller of New York. The staunch conservative Goldwater was widely seen in the liberal Northeastern United States as a right-wing extremist; he had voted against the Civil Rights Act of 1964, and the Johnson campaign portrayed him as a warmonger who as president would provoke a nuclear war.

In contrast to New York, Pennsylvania, New Jersey, Massachusetts, Connecticut, Rhode Island and Michigan, Goldwater did not write upper New England off from the beginning of his presidential campaign before Kennedy’s assassination. However, Goldwater’s self-avowed extremism was such that he was the first Republican disendorsed by many newspapers in the region since the party was founded. Polls never gave any doubt that Goldwater would lose Maine, despite considerable September campaigning by running mate Miller.

Vote
Johnson carried Maine by a wide margin of 37.66%, making him the first Democratic candidate since Woodrow Wilson in 1912 to carry the state, and the first since Franklin Pierce in 1852 to win a majority (Wilson won the state in 1912 with only a plurality of 39.43%). Johnson was also the first Democrat to sweep all of Maine’s counties. This is also the best Democratic performance in a presidential election in Maine to date.

He was the first Democrat to carry Somerset County since Martin Van Buren in 1836, the first since Pierce to carry the counties of Franklin, Oxford, Penobscot and Piscataquis and the first since Winfield S. Hancock in 1880 to carry Aroostook County. Populous Cumberland County, along with Lincoln County, had last voted Democratic for Woodrow Wilson in 1912, while the counties of Hancock, Knox and Waldo had last supported a Democrat when giving Wilson a plurality in 1916.

This would prove the last occasion Waldo County voted for a Democratic presidential candidate until 1996, and last when Hancock, Knox and Lincoln Counties would support a Democratic Presidential nominee until Bill Clinton in 1992. Johnson's 80.14% in Androscoggin County is also the last time, as of 2020, that any candidate has broken 80% in any Maine county, and the only time that a Democrat has done so.

Results

Results by county

See also
 United States presidential elections in Maine

Notes

References

Maine
1964
1964 Maine elections